Enrico Ricardo "Ricky" Januarie (born 2 January 1982) is a South African professional rugby union player. He currently plays for SU Agen Lot-et-Garonne of the Rugby Pro D2 second-level division in France. He has also been a member of the South Africa national rugby union team, having won the 2007 Rugby World Cup. While he announced his retirement from international rugby in 2011, he has been playing professionally in domestic competition, mostly in France, since 2009.

Career
Januarie was one of the top players of his high school team, Weston High School, in Vredenburg, South Africa. He is known for scoring the match-winning try against New Zealand in a 2008 Tri Nations Series match that the Springboks had won 30–28. In November 2009, whilst a member of the South African Western Province rugby team, Januarie joined the Welsh regional team Ospreys on a three-month loan arrangement, with questions of him potentially being an ineligible player due to pre-season obligations with Western Province and the 2010 Currie Cup pre-season matches having been solved. In 2011, he left South Africa and joined Lyon OU in France and spent four years with the team. Januarie then signed on with La Rochelle for two years. In June 2017, he signed with Agen and has been an active player on the team since then.

References

External links 

1982 births
Living people
People from Saldanha Bay Local Municipality
Cape Coloureds
Lyon OU players
South African rugby union players
South Africa international rugby union players
Golden Lions players
Lions (United Rugby Championship) players
Stormers players
Western Province (rugby union) players
Ospreys (rugby union) players
Rugby union scrum-halves
Expatriate rugby union players in France
Expatriate rugby union players in Wales
South African expatriate rugby union players
South African expatriate sportspeople in Wales
South African expatriate sportspeople in France
Stade Rochelais players
SU Agen Lot-et-Garonne players
Rugby union players from the Western Cape